Abram de Swaan (born 8 January 1942) is a Dutch essayist, sociologist and professor emeritus from the University of Amsterdam.

In 1996, he became member of the Royal Netherlands Academy of Arts and Sciences. He was elected a member of the Academia Europaea in 2000.

He developed the concept of a global language system.

He received the P. C. Hooft Award in 2008.

Bibliography

Books in Dutch 
Amerika in termijnen (1968)
Halverwege de Heilstaat (essays; 1983)
Zorg en de Staat (1989)
Perron Nederland (1991)
Moord en de staat (2003)
Tegen de vrouwen (2019)

Books in English 
In Care of the State (1988)
The Management of Normality (1990)
Words of the World (2001)
The Killing Compartments (2015)

Awards 
 P. C. Hooft Award (2008) for his oeuvre

References

External links 
 

1942 births
Living people
Dutch essayists
Members of Academia Europaea
Members of the Royal Netherlands Academy of Arts and Sciences
Writers from Amsterdam
P. C. Hooft Award winners
Academic staff of the University of Amsterdam